Comedy Superstar is an Indian stand-up comedy competition reality television series, which premiered on August 22, 2015, and was broadcast on SAB TV. The series was produced by Pyramid Films and directed Arun Sheshkumar. The series was a talent hunt, which provided a platform to the stand-up comedians from all over India to showcase their comic skills and win the title of Comedy Superstar

The series was hosted by Sudeepa Singh and Jay Soni, while Sushmita Sen, Sonu Sood and Shekhar Suman were the judges of the show.
Sanjeev Attri From (Pathankot.Punjab) won the title of India's first Comedy Superstar, while Vikas Giri was the first runner-up, Rajeev Goldy was the second runner-up and Pushpinder Zira was the third runner-up.

Hosts
 Sudeepa Singh
 Jay Soni

Music
Comedy Superstar title track Sung By Bollywood Playback Singer  Amika Shail.

Judges
 Sushmita Sen
 Sonu Sood
 Shekhar Suman

References

2015 Indian television series debuts
Indian reality television series
Indian stand-up comedy television series
Hindi-language television shows
Sony SAB original programming